Mictochroa is a genus of moths of the family Noctuidae.

Species
 Mictochroa albirena Druce, 1909
 Mictochroa ambigua Schaus, 1911
 Mictochroa angularis Schaus, 1904
 Mictochroa caterva Schaus, 1904
 Mictochroa caulea Schaus, 1929
 Mictochroa costiplaga E. D. Jones, 1915
 Mictochroa dolens Schaus, 1911
 Mictochroa farona Schaus, 1904
 Mictochroa fasciata E. D. Jones, 1915
 Mictochroa harmonica Druce, 1909
 Mictochroa indigna Dyar, [1927]
 Mictochroa octosema Dognin, 1914
 Mictochroa pallidula E. D. Jones, 1921
 Mictochroa parigana Schaus, 1904
 Mictochroa paulata E. D. Jones, 1921
 Mictochroa pyrostrota Dognin, 1914
 Mictochroa rectilinea E. D. Jones, 1915
 Mictochroa renata E. D. Jones, 1915
 Mictochroa rhodostrota Dognin, 1914
 Mictochroa selinitis Dyar, 1912
 Mictochroa thermoptera Druce, 1909
 Mictochroa triangularis Schaus, 1904
 Mictochroa zonella Druce, 1889

References
 
 

Acontiinae